Tetrapleura picta is a species of ulidiid or picture-winged fly in the genus Tetrapleura of the family Ulidiidae.

References

Ulidiidae